Mazagaon, also spelled Mazgaon and Mazagon (Portuguese rule Mazagão), and pronounced by the Catholics as 'Mazgon' or 'Maz-a-gon' and the Marathi-speakers as Mazhgav, is one of the seven islands of Mumbai.

References 

Notes

Sources
• Matharpacady Village Website

See also 
Joseph Baptista Gardens

Neighbourhoods in Mumbai
Islands of Mumbai
History of Mumbai
Islands of India
Populated places in India